Steinkjer is the administrative centre of the municipality of Steinkjer in Trøndelag county, Norway. The town is located at the northeastern end of the inner-most part of the Trondheimsfjorden, at the mouth of the river Steinkjerelva.  In the eastern part of the town, the river of Figgja also flows into the fjord. The town is split in two by Steinkjerelva, creating the two traditional neighborhoods of Nordsia and Sørsia.  Both the European route E6 highway and the Nordlandsbanen railway line run through the town, the latter serving the city at Steinkjer Station.  Steinkjer Church and Egge Church are both located in the town.

Prior to 1 January 2018, the town was the administrative centre of Nord-Trøndelag county, and since that day it has been the seat of the newly created Trøndelag county.  This means the Trøndelag County Municipality is based here as is the County Governor, the representative of the King and Government of Norway in Trøndelag county.

History
From the creation of municipalities under the formannskapsdistrikt law in 1837, the village of Steinkjer was part of the municipality of Stod. In 1857, the village was designated as a kjøpstad (town).  On 23 January 1858, the newly designated town was separated from Stod municipality to form a municipality of its own. The initial population of Steinkjer was 1,150. 

During the 1960s, there were many municipal mergers across Norway due to the work of the Schei Committee.  On 1 January 1964, a large merger took place: the neighboring municipalities of Beitstad (population: 2,563), Egge (population: 3,476), Kvam (population: 1,245), Ogndal (population: 2,678), Sparbu (population: 4,027), and Stod (population: 1,268) were all merged with the town of Steinkjer (population: 4,325) to form the new municipality of Steinkjer.

Name
The town (and municipality) is named after the old Steinkjer farm, since the town is built on the site of the old farm. The first element is steinn (m) which means "stone" or "rock". The last element is ker (n) which means a "barrier made for catching fish".

Media gallery

References

Populated places in Trøndelag
Former municipalities of Norway
Cities and towns in Norway
Steinkjer
1858 establishments in Norway